Muong Liep is a small river town in Sainyabuli Province, Laos. It is located to the southeast of Muang Pa. There is a local legend here that Pa Kao, a limestone rock,  rises straight upwards on the left bank of the river.

References

Populated places in Sainyabuli Province